Lyon County is a county in the U.S. state of Nevada. As of the 2020 census, the population was 59,235. Lyon County comprises the Fernley, NV Micropolitan Statistical Area, which is part of the Reno-Carson City-Fernley, NV Combined Statistical Area.

History
Lyon County was one of the nine original counties created on November 25, 1861. It was named after Nathaniel Lyon, the first Union General to be killed in the Civil War. Its first county seat was established at Dayton on November 29, 1861, which had just changed its name from Nevada City in 1862, and which had been called Chinatown before that. After the Dayton Court House burned down in 1909, the seat was moved to Yerington in 1911. There were stories that it was named for Captain Robert Lyon, a survivor of the Pyramid Lake War in 1860, but Nevada State Archives staff discovered a county seal with the picture of the Civil War general, settling the conflict.

Geography
It is the fourth-smallest county in Nevada by area. The highest point is approximately 10,565 feet (3,220 m) on the northeast ridge of Middle Sister, the peak of which is located in adjacent Mono County, California, while the highest independent mountain completely within Lyon County is the nearby East Sister. The most topographically prominent peak in Lyon County is Bald Mountain.

Part of the Toiyabe National Forest is located within Lyon County.

Major highways

  Interstate 11 (Future)
  Interstate 80
  Interstate 80 Business (Wadsworth–Fernley)
  U.S. Route 50
  U.S. Route 95
  U.S. Route 50 Alternate
  U.S. Route 95 Alternate
  State Route 208
  State Route 338
  State Route 339
  State Route 340
  State Route 341
  State Route 427
  State Route 439
  State Route 823
  State Route 824
  State Route 827
  State Route 828
  State Route 829

Adjacent counties and city
 Washoe County - north
 Storey County - northwest
 Churchill County - east
 Douglas County - west
 Carson City - west
 Mineral County - southeast
 Mono County, California - southwest

Demographics

2000 census
As of the census of 2000, there were 34,501 people, 13,007 households, and 9,443 families living in the county. The population density was 17 people per square mile (7/km2). There were 14,279 housing units at an average density of 7 per square mile (3/km2). The racial makeup of the county was 88.62% White, 0.65% Black or African American, 2.45% Native American, 0.61% Asian, 0.14% Pacific Islander, 4.59% from other races, and 2.94% from two or more races. 10.97% of the population were Hispanic or Latino of any race.

There were 13,007 households, out of which 33.20% had children under the age of 18 living with them, 58.40% were married couples living together, 9.10% had a female householder with no husband present, and 27.40% were non-families. 21.40% of all households were made up of individuals, and 8.30% had someone living alone who was 65 years of age or older. The average household size was 2.61 and the average family size was 3.02.

In the county, the population was spread out, with 27.10% under the age of 18, 6.60% from 18 to 24, 27.30% from 25 to 44, 25.20% from 45 to 64, and 13.70% who were 65 years of age or older. The median age was 38 years. For every 100 females, there were 102.50 males. For every 100 females age 18 and over, there were 100.00 males.

The median income for a household in the county was $40,699, and the median income for a family was $44,887. Males had a median income of $34,034 versus $25,914 for females. The per capita income for the county was $18,543. About 7.20% of families and 10.40% of the population were below the poverty line, including 14.10% of those under age 18 and 7.10% of those age 65 or over.

From 2000 until 2008, Lyon County was one of the fastest-growing counties in the United States. However, its growth rate collapsed during 2008.

2010 census
As of the 2010 United States Census, there were 51,980 people, 19,808 households, and 14,137 families living in the county. The racial makeup of the county was 85.0% white, 2.5% American Indian, 1.4% Asian, 0.8% black or African American, 0.3% Pacific islander, 6.4% from other races, and 3.7% from two or more races. Those of Hispanic or Latino origin made up 14.8% of the population. In terms of ancestry, 20.0% were German, 18.5% were English, 15.5% were Irish, 5.9% were Italian, and 5.3% were American.

Of the 19,808 households, 33.2% had children under the age of 18 living with them, 55.3% were married couples living together, 10.2% had a female householder with no husband present, 28.6% were non-families, and 22.1% of all households were made up of individuals. The average household size was 2.61 and the average family size was 3.02. The median age was 40.9 years.

The median income for a household in the county was $48,433 and the median income for a family was $56,106. Males had a median income of $45,319 versus $31,536 for females. The per capita income for the county was $21,041. About 8.7% of families and 12.8% of the population were below the poverty line, including 14.9% of those under age 18 and 6.6% of those age 65 or over.

Communities

Cities
Fernley
Yerington (county seat)

Census-designated places
Dayton
Silver City
Silver Springs
Smith Valley
Stagecoach

Other unincorporated places

Argo
Artesia
Bucklands Station
Cambridge
Churchhill
Como
Davis Station
Greenville
Hoye
Hudson
Johntown
Ludwig
Lux
Marshland
Mason
Mound House
Nordyke
Palmyra
Pine Grove
Ramsey
Rapids City
Rockland
Simpson
Stone Cabin
Sutro
Sweetwater
Thompson
Tippecanoe
Twin Flat
Walker River
Weeks
Wellington
Willington Springs
Wichman

Politics
Although not so historically Republican as neighboring Douglas County, Lyon is nonetheless a powerfully Republican county. The last Democrat to carry the county was Franklin D. Roosevelt in 1940 – the county was one of three in Nevada to vote for Barry Goldwater in 1964 – and Jimmy Carter in 1976 is the last Democrat to pass forty percent of Lyon County's vote.

An advisory question about Lyon County's legal brothels was put on the 2018 ballot. "Lyon County Question 1" asked whether or not voters wanted to rescind Title 3, Chapter 5, which is the Lyon County Brothel Ordinance. Out of 20,674 votes cast, 4,031 voted to have it rescinded, and 16,643 voted to keep the brothels open in Lyon County.

Education
Lyon County has sixteen schools provided by the Lyon County School District.

Transportation

Air
There are three public airports in Lyon County: 
Yerington Municipal Airport, with a 5,800-foot-long runway.
Silver Springs Airport, with a 7,200-foot-long runway capable of accepting 737s (its runway lights are visible when driving down on Fir Street from Ramsey Weeks cut-off to 95A).
Tiger Field on US 95A about three miles from Fernley, with a gravel runway of 2,750 feet and a paved runway of 5,600 feet.

Railroads
The Central Pacific (the first transcontinental railroad) ran through the county, although a portion of the original route has been shifted for a new route south of Wadsworth in favor of Fernley. The Central Pacific later became the Southern Pacific Railroad which was merged into Union Pacific in 1996.

The Virginia and Truckee Railroad runs through Mound House in western Lyon County, on its way from Carson City to Virginia City.

The narrow-gauge Carson and Colorado Railroad had its terminus in Mound House, where it intersected with the V&T. It traveled east through Dayton, then turned south to the Mason Valley, and east again on its way to Walker Lake. Later a branch line connected the C&C to the Southern Pacific at Hazen. While the line west of Silver Springs was removed, the line from Hazen to Walker Lake (now standard gauge) is still in place, and used several times each week by the Union Pacific to service the NV Energy Fort Churchill Generating Station, near Yerington.

The Eagle Salt Works Railroad ran for 13.5 miles, primarily on the original Central Pacific grade from Luva (two miles east of Fernley) to Eagle Salt Works Railroad.

The Nevada Copper Belt Railroad ran on the west side of the Mason Valley.

Train
Amtrak's California Zephyr passenger train passes through, but does not stop in Lyon County. The nearest Amtrak passenger stations are located in Reno and Winnemucca. The California Zephyr runs from the San Francisco Bay Area to Chicago via Salt Lake City, Denver and Omaha.

Entertainment
Prostitution is licensed and legalized in Lyon county. There are several open ranches, including:
Moonlite Bunny Ranch (the most famous Lyon Country brothel) 
Sagebrush Ranch
All are located in Mound House, which is on US Highway 50 adjacent to the line dividing Lyon and Carson City counties.

Several gambling casinos are located in various parts of Lyon County, as are numerous restaurants, clubs, saloons, etc.

See also

 National Register of Historic Places listings in Lyon County, Nevada

Notes

References

External links

 

 
1861 establishments in Nevada Territory
Populated places established in 1861